The Richardson number (Ri) is named after Lewis Fry Richardson (1881–1953).  It is the dimensionless number that expresses the ratio of the buoyancy term to the flow shear term:

The Richardson number, or one of several variants, is of practical importance in weather forecasting and in investigating density and turbidity currents in oceans, lakes, and reservoirs.

When considering flows in which density differences are small (the
Boussinesq approximation), it is common to use the reduced gravity
g'  and the relevant parameter is the densimetric Richardson number

which is used frequently when considering atmospheric or oceanic flows.

If the Richardson number is much less than unity, buoyancy is unimportant
in the flow.  If it is much greater than unity, buoyancy is dominant (in
the sense that there is insufficient kinetic energy to homogenize the fluids).

If the Richardson number is of order unity, then the flow is likely to
be buoyancy-driven: the energy of the flow derives from the potential energy in the system originally.

Aviation 
In aviation, the Richardson number is used as a rough measure of expected air turbulence. A lower value indicates a higher degree of turbulence. Values in the range 10 to 0.1 are typical, with values below unity indicating significant turbulence.

Thermal convection 

In thermal convection problems, Richardson number represents the importance of natural convection relative to the forced convection. The Richardson number in this context is defined as

 

where g is the gravitational acceleration,  is the thermal expansion coefficient, Thot is the hot wall temperature, Tref is the reference temperature, L is the characteristic length, and V is the characteristic velocity.

The Richardson number can also be expressed by using a combination of the Grashof number and Reynolds number,

 

Typically, the natural convection is negligible when Ri < 0.1, forced convection is negligible when Ri > 10, and neither is negligible when 0.1 < Ri < 10. It may be noted that usually the forced convection is large relative to natural convection except in the case of extremely low forced flow velocities. However, buoyancy often plays a significant role in defining the laminar–turbulent transition of a mixed convection flow. In the design of water filled thermal energy storage tanks, the Richardson number can be useful.

Oceanography 
In oceanography, the Richardson number has a more general form which takes stratification into account. It is a measure of relative importance of mechanical and density effects in the water column, as described by the Taylor–Goldstein equation, used to model Kelvin–Helmholtz instability which is driven by sheared flows.

where N is the Brunt–Väisälä frequency.

The Richardson number defined above is always considered positive. A negative value of N² (i.e. complex N) indicates unstable density gradients with active convective overturning.  Under such circumstances the magnitude of negative Ri is not generally of interest.  It can be shown that Ri < 1/4 is a necessary condition for velocity shear to overcome the tendency of a stratified fluid to remain stratified, and some mixing (turbulence) will generally occur. When Ri is large, turbulent mixing across the stratification is generally suppressed.

References

Dimensionless numbers
Atmospheric dispersion modeling
Fluid dynamics
Buoyancy
Dimensionless numbers of fluid mechanics